Bjarne Johnsen (7 July 1897 – 23 January 1982) was a Norwegian footballer who played for Brann. He was capped six times for the Norway national football team between 1922 and 1923, scoring five goals.

Career statistics

International

International goals
Scores and results list Norway's goal tally first.

References

1897 births
1982 deaths
Footballers from Bergen
Norwegian footballers
Norway international footballers
Association football forwards
SK Brann players